Écosse is the French-language word for Scotland. 

Ecosse may refer to:

Air Ecosse, a defunct Scottish commuter airline
Ascari Ecosse, a British sports car
Ecosse Films, a British film and television production company
Ecurie Ecosse, a Scottish motor racing team